Northpower Limited (Northpower) is an electricity distribution company, based in Whangarei,  New Zealand.

Northpower owns and manages the electricity lines network in the Whangarei and Kaipara districts. The service area covers 5,700 km2 and extends from Topuni in the south, to Bland Bay in the north.  In addition to the residential and commercial customers in the region, the network also serves the New Zealand Refinery, Golden Bay Cement and the Fonterra dairy plant at Kauri.

Ownership
The company is 100% owned by the Northpower Electric Power Trust on behalf of electricity consumers in the Whangarei and Kaipara districts. The Trust is governed by seven Trustees elected every three years at the same time as the local body elections.

The Northpower Electric Power Trust (NEPT) Deed requires that options for the future ownership of shares in Northpower are reviewed every five years. The Trustees of the NEPT must consult with Northpower consumers to determine if the current Trust ownership structure is what consumers want, or if consumers would prefer a change.  Following consultation with the people of the Kaipara and Whangarei Districts between February and June 2012, a decision was made at a public meeting of the Trust for Northpower to remain in consumer ownership.

Distribution network
The Northpower subtransmission and distribution network is connected to the national grid via five Transpower substations located at Bream Bay (close to the Marsden Point Oil Refinery), Dargaville, Maungatapere, Maungaturoto and the suburb of Kensington in Whangarei.

Network statistics

* for the year ended 31 March 2011

Network performance
The Northpower reported the performance of the network for the 2010/11 year as follows:

The reliability of the Northpower network is around the middle of the range of performance of the distribution companies reporting to the Commerce Commission under Information Disclosure requirements.

History
The history of Northpower dates back to 1920 when the Northern Wairoa Hydro Electric Power Board was formed.  The main predecessor organisation was the North Auckland Electric Power Board which commenced operations in 1929. The trading name 'Northpower' was adopted from 1 May 1990.

In 1993, Northpower purchased the small hydro-electric power station at Wairua Falls, near Titoki.

The  Electricity Industry Reform Act was passed in 1998, and this required that all electricity companies be split into either the lines (network) business or the supply business (generating and/or selling electricity) by 1 April 1999.  The energy retail business of Northpower was sold to ECNZ with effect from 1 November 1998, and renamed Northpower Energy. The name was later changed to Meridian Energy (1999).

Wairua Falls hydro scheme
Northpower owns and operates the Wairua power station owned near Titoki.  This station was built in the early 1900s with the first of the generators installed in 1916. The original machines are still operating. The water canal intake was upgraded in 2009. New weir flap gates have also been installed. The power station's aging control system has also been replaced. A 4th generator was installed at the site in 2007.

The typical annual energy output from the station is 22  GWh.

Subsidiaries
 Northpower Contracting
 Northpower Fibre

See also
 Electricity sector in New Zealand

References

External links
 Northpower website

Electric power distribution network operators in New Zealand
Northland Region
Telecommunications companies of New Zealand
New Zealand companies established in 1920
Energy companies established in 1920